The Citadel Bulldogs are the athletic teams that represent The Citadel. All sports participate in the NCAA Division I except football, which competes in the NCAA Division I Football Championship Subdivision (FCS). Since 1936, varsity sports have competed in the Southern Conference. The Citadel fields teams in sixteen sports, nine for men and seven for women.

The Citadel is one of only two Division I schools that do not sponsor women's basketball; the other is fellow Southern Conference member and senior military college VMI.

Conference affiliations
The Citadel competes in the Southern Conference for all sports.

Southern Intercollegiate Athletic Association
From 1909 to 1935, The Citadel played as a part of the Southern Intercollegiate Athletic Association, a conglomerate of many schools which gave birth to the Southern Conference during a clash over freshman eligibility. The Citadel remained in the SIAA after eight schools joined with six non-SIAA members to create the SoCon in 1921.

Southern Conference
Shortly after thirteen schools departed the Southern Conference to form the Southeastern Conference (SEC), The Citadel and six other schools joined the conference. Furman also joined in 1936, making them and The Citadel the schools with the longest current continuous tenure in the conference. (VMI joined even earlier in 1924, but was not a member from 2003 to 2014.)

Timeline

Sports sponsored

A member of the Southern Conference, The Citadel sponsors teams in nine men's and seven women's NCAA sanctioned sports.

Baseball

The Citadel's most successful athletics program, the baseball team has won thirteen Southern Conference championships and eight Southern Conference baseball tournament championships. The 1990 team advanced to the College World Series, becoming the first military school to do so; they finished with a record of 46–14 and were ranked sixth in the final Collegiate Baseball poll that season. The Bulldogs are coached by Tony Skole.  As of the end of the 2015 season, 49 players have been selected in the Major League Baseball Draft.

Basketball

The Citadel Bulldogs basketball team dates to the 1900–01 season, posting an all-time record of 914–1176. The Citadel's 1966–67 season is chronicled in Pat Conroy's My Losing Season. The 2008–09 squad won 20 games for just the second time in school history and participated in the postseason for the first time, playing in the CollegeInsider.com Tournament; they were defeated in the first round by eventual champion Old Dominion. The team has never played in the NCAA Division I men's basketball tournament.

The current Head Coach is Ed Conroy '89, cousin of best selling author Pat Conroy '67. Recent head coaches have included Duggar Baucom and Chuck Driesell, son of coaching legend Lefty Driesell.

Football

The Citadel has won four Southern Conference Championships in 1961, 1992, 2015 and 2016. In 1960, the Bulldogs won the Tangerine Bowl, defeating  27–0. The Bulldogs have appeared in the FCS Playoffs five times, advancing to the second round in 1992 before losing to eventual runner-up Youngstown State. The 1992 squad finished with a record of 11–2 and was ranked #1 in the final regular season I-AA poll.

The current Head Coach is Brent Thompson who has compiled a record of 15–7 including an 11–5 mark and one Conference Championship in his two season.

Since 2005, three Bulldog players have been drafted by NFL teams. Several alumni have played in the pro ranks including former ESPN analyst Paul Maguire, a tight end and punter with the LA/San Diego Chargers and Buffalo Bills; running back Stump Mitchell with the St. Louis/Arizona Cardinals, kicker Greg Davis who played for several teams including Atlanta, Tampa Bay and Arizona; running back Travis Jervey who played in 2 Super Bowls with Green Bay and fullback Nehemiah Broughton who played for Washington, the New York Giants and Arizona. Wide receiver Andre Roberts of the Bills and cornerback Cortez Allen of Pittsburgh are currently active.

Rifle

The Rifle team is coached by William Smith, in his 17th season in 2017–18. Under Smith's leadership, the team returned to varsity status in 2001 after 9 years at the club level. The Bulldogs have claimed SEARC championships in 2001–02 and 2010–11 and National Championships in 1939, 1953, 1963, and 1965. The team also claimed eight Southern Conference titles between 1960 and 1974. The pre-NCAA sponsoring body, the National Rifle Association, credits The Citadel with one Intercollege Rifle Team Trophy, in 1963 The team competes at the Inouye Marksmanship Center, a highly advanced $3.2 million facility that is also utilized by The Citadel's club pistol team, ROTC, local law enforcement and the South Carolina National Guard

Women's soccer

The women's soccer team was established in 2001, and is currently coached by Ciaran Traquair.  The team plays its home games at WLI Field.

Volleyball

The volleyball team was the first women's team sport sponsored by The Citadel, established in 1998, shortly after the integration of women into the Corps of Cadets in 1996.  The team is currently led by Dave Zelenock and competes in McAlister Field House.

Wrestling

The Citadel Bulldogs wrestling team has claimed Southern Conference championships in 1967 and 2004, and have 4 All-Americans, with 2 from the 2013 squad. They are currently coached by Ryan LeBlanc. Vandiver Hall is the practice facility on campus for the wrestling team, while the McAlister Field House hosts home dual meets and tournaments, also located on campus.

Defunct teams
 Boxing (discontinued 1953)
 Men's Golf (discontinued 2004)
 Men's Soccer (discontinued 2004)
 Men's Swimming & Diving (discontinued 1983)

Facilities
The Citadel football team plays in Johnson Hagood Stadium, a 11,500 seat stadium just to the south of campus. The stadium is undergoing a long term renovation and rebuilding, which includes the Altman Athletic Center, completed in 2001, and the rebuilt west stands, 2006 and club tower, 2008. The team practices at the Mayberry Triplets Practice facility on the north edge of campus, and utilizes Seignious Hall, on campus behind McAlister Field House and Vandiver Hall, for locker rooms, team meeting space, and weightlifting.

The baseball team shares 6,000 seat Joseph P. Riley Jr. Park with the professional Charleston RiverDogs of the Class-A South Atlantic League for games, and practices at College Park, on Rutledge Avenue. The Citadel owns College Park and has considered a number of future uses for it, including a stadium for the women's soccer team and a tennis complex.

The basketball, wrestling, and volleyball teams use McAlister Field House, a 6,000 seat facility on campus for games and practices. The basketball team's locker room is also in McAlister.

The women's soccer team practices and plays on WLI Field, located on campus to the west of the mess hall and Indian Hill. WLI Field is the former home of the baseball team and men's soccer team.

The rifle team uses the Inouye Marksmanship Center, which is situated behind WLI field on the banks of the Ashley River.

The tennis team competes at the Earle Tennis Center, completed in 1990. Comprising ten courts, the facility is located between Stevens Barracks and the infirmary.

All teams, other than football, baseball and basketball, utilize Vandiver Hall, located behind McAlister Field House is home to track offices, golf offices, wrestling offices, various locker rooms, an indoor golf practice facility, indoor batting cages for baseball and the wrestling practice facility.

Rivalries

The Citadel's most heated rivalries are with the VMI Keydets, Furman Paladins, Charleston Southern Buccaneers and College of Charleston Cougars. Furman has been the longest running rivalry, although the Paladins have led the series in football for many decades. While The Citadel has played VMI in many sports for decades, the rivalry has only developed since the creation of the Silver Shako trophy for football in 1976. The football game is now known as the Military Classic of the South. Crosstown rival College of Charleston has become a major rivalry in basketball and baseball, although the Cougars have controlled the games in basketball since joining the Southern Conference (the Cougars left for the Colonial Athletic Association in 2013).

Other historical rivalries include Clemson, South Carolina, Wofford, Presbyterian College, and Newberry College.

Championships
The Bulldogs claim four national championships in rifle, including two individual national championships.  In addition, varsity Bulldog teams have claimed 41 conference championships and record 224 individual conference championships.

Club sports
 Ice Hockey
 Lacrosse
 Multisport (e.g., triathlon, road racing, cycling, swimming)
 Pistol
 Men's Rugby
 Women's Rugby
 Sailing
 Men's Soccer

References

External links